RFA Ennerdale (A173) was a Dale-class fleet tanker and landing ship (gantry) of the Royal Fleet Auxiliary.

Taken over by the Admiralty and completed as a Landing Ship Gantry carrying 15 LCMs with accommodation for 150 military personnel. Took part in the North African, Italian, and Far East landings.

In August 1943, Captain S.T. Dunster was awarded the OBE. The citation read:
"The ship [RFA Ennerdale] played a vital part in carrying oil and petrol to forces operating off the coast of North Africa and was the focus of sustained and heavy air attacks. So skillfully was she handled by her Master and so efficient was her barrage that she sustained no damage, and performed invaluable work. In addition to this service, her Master did well in two Malta Convoys earlier in the war. His courage and resource have been unfailing."

In December 1945 she was damaged by a mine at Port Swettenham and returned to UK for repair. After the war she resumed freighting duties as a tanker.

Ennerdale was sold to the British Iron & Steel Corporation for scrapping and broken up 1959–60.

References 

 
 
 

Dale-class oilers
Tankers of the Royal Fleet Auxiliary
1941 ships
Ships built by Swan Hunter